Eremophila serrulata, commonly known as serrate-leaved eremophila, is a flowering plant in the figwort family, Scrophulariaceae and is endemic to Australia. It is an erect or spreading shrub whose leaves are sticky and have small serrations, and flowers that have green, yellowish-green or yellowish-brown petals.

Description

The petal tube is green, yellowish-green or yellowish-brown and the inner and outer surfaces are covered with glandular hairs. The 4 stamens extend beyond the end of the petal tube. Flowering occurs throughout the year but mainly from April to October.

Taxonomy and naming
The species was first formally described in 1847 by botanist  Alphonse Pyramus de Candolle based on an unpublished description by Allan Cunningham . They gave it the name Stenochilus serrulatus and published the description in Prodromus Systematis Naturalis Regni Vegetabilis. In 1917 George Claridge Druce changed the name to Eremophila serrulata and published the change in The Botanical Exchange Club and Society of the British Isles Report for 1916, Supplement 2. The specific epithet (serrulata) is the diminutive form of the Latin word serratus meaning "toothed like a saw", hence finely serrated, referring to the edges of the leaves of this species.

Distribution and habitat
Green fuchsia bush is widespread and common in Western Australia, South Australia, the Northern Territory and New South Wales. In Western Australia it is found between Warburton and Shark Bay. In South Australia it occurs in the North-Western, Lake Eyre, Nullarbor, Gairdner-Torrens, Flinders Ranges, Eastern, Eyre Peninsula and Northern Lofty botanical regions. In the Northern Territory it is only found in the far south-west and in New South Wales in the north-west plains, south-west plains and northern far-west plains. It often grows in skeletal soils on rocky hillsides frequently in mulga or mallee woodland.

Conservation
Eremophila serrulata is classified as "not threatened" by the Western Australian Government Department of Parks and Wildlife.

Use in horticulture
Although not a spectacular plant in flower, this eremophila is a very hardy, long-lived shrub, and it attracts nectar-feeding birds. It will grow in situations such as those with heavy clay soils, where others will not. It can be propagated from cuttings but may sucker when grown on its own roots, however if this behaviour is undesirable, it can also be grafted onto Myoporum rootstock. It will grow in most soils in full sun or part shade, is very drought tolerant and frost tolerant.

References

serrulata
Flora of New South Wales
Flora of South Australia
Flora of the Northern Territory
Eudicots of Western Australia
Plants described in 1847
Taxa named by Allan Cunningham (botanist)